Calliostoma fernandezi is a species of sea snail, a marine gastropod mollusk in the family Calliostomatidae.

Description
The size of the shell varies between 9 mm and 29 mm.

Distribution
This species occurs in the Caribbean Sea from Colombia to French Guiana.

References

 Princz, D. 1978. Una nueva especie del genero Calliostoma (Mollusca: Gastropoda) en el Mar Caribe. Memoria de la Sociedad de Ciencias Naturales La Salle 38: 151–155.

External links
 To Encyclopedia of Life
 To USNM Invertebrate Zoology Mollusca Collection
 To World Register of Marine Species
 

fernandezi
Gastropods described in 1978